The 1950–51 FA Cup was the 70th season of the world's oldest football cup competition, the Football Association Challenge Cup, commonly known as the FA Cup. Newcastle United won the competition for the fourth time, beating Blackpool 2–0 in the final at Wembley, London.

Matches were scheduled to be played at the stadium of the team named first on the date specified for each round, which was always a Saturday. If scores were level after 90 minutes had been played, a replay would take place at the stadium of the second-named team later the same week. If the replayed match was drawn further replays would be held at neutral venues until a winner was determined. If scores were level after 90 minutes had been played in a replay, a 30-minute period of extra time would be played.

Calendar

Results

First round proper

At this stage 43 clubs from the Football League Third Division North and South joined 25 non-league clubs having come through the qualifying rounds. Gateshead and Northampton Town as the strongest Third Division finishers in the previous season, were given a bye to the Third Round along with Stockport County, who qualified to the fifth round the last season. Of the four new clubs admitted to Football League this season, only Gillingham entered in this round and the other three were required to start in the qualifying rounds (which caused Shrewsbury Town to withdraw in protest).  To make the number of matches up, non-league Willington received a bye to this round. Matches were played on Saturday, 25 November 1950. Six matches were drawn, with replays taking place later the same week.

Second round proper
The matches were played on Saturday, 9 December 1950. Three matches were drawn, with replays taking place on the following Wednesday. One second replay was played on Monday, 18 December 1950.

Third round proper
The 44 First and Second Division clubs entered the competition at this stage along with Gateshead, Northampton Town and Stockport County. The matches were scheduled to be played on Saturday, 6 January 1951, though two were postponed until later the same week. Five matches were drawn, with replays taking place later the same week.

Fourth round proper
The matches were played on Saturday, 27 January 1951. Two matches were drawn, the replays being played on Wednesday, 31 January 1951.

Fifth Round Proper
The matches were played on Saturday, 10 February 1951. One match was drawn and replayed the following Wednesday.

Sixth Round Proper

Replays

Semi-finals

Replays

Final

The final took place on Saturday, 28 April 1951 at Wembley and ended in a victory for Newcastle United over Blackpool by 2–0, with both goals scored by Jackie Milburn. The attendance was 100,000.

Notes
A. : Match played at Ninian Park, Cardiff.
B. : The original tie was abandoned after 34 minutes due to fog, with the score 0–0.
C. : Match played at Borough Park, Workington.
D. : Match played at White Hart Lane, London.
E. : Match played at Victoria Ground, Stoke-on-Trent.

References
General
The FA Cup Archive at TheFA.com
English FA Cup 1950/51  at Soccerbase
FA Cup 1950/51 results at Footballsite
Specific

 
FA Cup seasons